Natálie Kocábová, also known as Natalie Kocab (born 16 May 1984) is a Czech poet, writer, and musician. She is the daughter of singer and political activist Michael Kocáb. She has released three solo studio albums, one extended play, four music videos, and featured on a number of other projects.

Early life
Natálie Kocábová was born on 16 May 1984 in Prague, Czechoslovakia. Her father, Michael Kocáb, was a singer and political activist. Her mother is an American, of British ancestry.

Career

Kocábová received her first exposure at the age of eleven by providing vocals for low-budget albums by Dagmar Patrasová, Baby studio s Dádou (1995) and Vánoce s Dádou (1996), both designed for children. Shortly before her debut release, she was credited as a co-writer on a track entitled "Some People" that appeared on the album Velvet Revolution (1999), by Michael Kocáb, Petr Kolář and Tomáš Kympl. Her debut Fly Apple Pie was released on January 9, 2000, through Epic Records in partnership with Sony BMG. The album was the first full-length record issued by a Czech artist in the 2000s, and featured fifteen tracks mainly in English, all composed by her father Michael Kocáb, whose name also appeared on the cover. Her mother, Marsha, also supplied lyrics. Upon its release, the album was negatively received by critics, who slammed the record, with some referring to it as a shallow marketing tactic from Kocáb and others accusing his daughter of nepotism. Two music videos were produced, for the tracks "So Changes Go" and "Mayday", but the constant negative publicity hurt the album's sales.

In following years, to protect herself from such criticism, Kocábová focused on writing her own poems and short novels. Her subsequent literary works, such as Slyšíš mě? (2002), Monarcha Absint (2003), Schola Alternativa (2004) and Někdo je v domě (2005), helped to establish her as an independent writer. Some of her other side projects included music productions; she was cast in the musical theatre production Starci na chmelu (2001/02), and also contributed vocals to her father's album Za kyslík (2002). Her sophomore studio effort, Hummingbirds in Iceland, was launched on June 12, 2006. As with her previous release, the record was distributed via Sony BMG and supervised by Kocáb. However, this time she also worked with other songwriters-producers, including Michal Pavlíček Jr, Michaela Poláková and Lukáš Máchal. The album was promoted by a video, for "Neverland", and received favorable reviews from journalists, who especially acknowledged its progressive sound; only a few critics repeated their criticisms. Nonetheless, Kocábová's second album was still not a great commercial success.

After two creatively calm years, during which she published a novel called Růže: Cesta za světlem... (2007), Kocábová began to take more initiative with her music, and also began experimenting with other genres. In 2008, she contributed the opening track "Tramtárie" to an all-female compilation Ohrožený druh by Michal Horáček, also on Sony BMG. Starting in 2009, the singer began collecting material for her next studio album. However, Walking on the A-bomb, produced by Jiří Burian, was rejected by Sony. After Kocábová signed a distribution deal with music magazine Report, the record was released in a cardboard sleeve on December 1, 2010. Her third album, preceded by an EP of the same name, was well received on the indie club circuit and she embarked on a tour of small venues.

Discography

Kocábová's discography consists of three solo studio albums, one extended play, four music videos and a number of other appearances.

Albums

Studio albums

A  Credited as Natalie Kocábová and Michael Kocáb.
B  Credited as Natalie Kocab.
C  Credited as Natalie Kocab and Michaela Poláková.

Extended plays

B  Credited as Natalie Kocab.

Other appearances

B  Credited as Natalie Kocab.
C  Credited as Natálka Kocábová.
D  topped at number 1 on the Czech Albums Chart. The set became the most selling album of a music band in the Czech Republic with the sale of 22,766 copies. As of 2011, its total sale reached 35,000 units, while being certified with double platinum from ČNS IFPI. In addition, the work won the Anděl Award as the Album of the Year.

Videos

Music videos

E  The album won the Best New Artist category at the Anděl Awards in 2010. (The album charted at number 23.)

Bibliography

Notes
A  The limited edition of the work, featuring 999 copies released in 2010, included graphics by her spouse Štěpán Vrána.
B  Credited as co-writer; along with Alena Ježková, Barbara Nesvadbová and Jaromír Švejdík (aka Jaromír 99).

Stageography
2002: Starci na chmelu (musical theatre; as Hanka)

Awards

Music polls

See also

Michael Kocáb

References

General

 

Specific

External links
 Natálie Kocábová on Discogs
 
 Natálie Kocábová images by Google Images

1984 births
Living people
Actresses from Prague
Czech screenwriters
Czech women screenwriters
Czech stage actresses
21st-century Czech women singers
Academy of Performing Arts in Prague alumni
Musicians from Prague
Writers from Prague
21st-century Czech poets
Czech women poets
21st-century Czech women writers
Czech people of American descent
Czech people of British descent